Episode 10 may refer to:

 Episode Ten (Primeval) 2009 TV episode of Primeval
 Episode 10 (The Young Pope) 2016 episode
 Episode 10 (Tá no Ar) 2015 episode
Attack on titan season 10

See also
 Episode (disambiguation)
 10 (disambiguation)
 X (disambiguation)